Senator Woodman may refer to:

Edwin E. Woodman (1838–1912), Wisconsin State Senate
William W. Woodman (1818–1901), Wisconsin State Senate